Yehor Volodymyrovych Cherniev (born 5 February 1985) is a Ukrainian politician currently serving as a People's Deputy of Ukraine from the Servant of the People party in the Verkhovna Rada, number 26 on the party's list. Deputy Chairman of the Committee on National Security, Defence and Intelligence of the Verkhovna Rada of Ukraine, Chairman of the Permanent Delegation of Ukraine at the NATO Parliamentary Assembly.

Early life and career 
Yehor Volodymyrovych Cherniev was born on 5 February 1985 in Berdiansk, then part of the Soviet Union.

In 2007, he graduated from the Kyiv National University of Culture and Arts with a degree in public relations management. The next year, he graduated from Kyiv National Economic University with a degree in business economics. He has also graduated from King's College London with a master's degree in science in public policy and management.

Following the beginning of the Russo-Ukrainian War in 2014, he joined the National Guard of Ukraine.

Political career 
Cherniev was elected as a People's Deputy of Ukraine in the 2019 Ukrainian parliamentary election as number 26 on Servant of the People's party list, and was an independent at the time of election. 

From August 2019 to October 2022, he served as Deputy Chairman of the Digital Transformation Committee of the Verkhovna Rada of Ukraine.

He is currently Deputy Chairman of the Committee on National Security, Defence and Intelligence of the Verkhovna Rada of Ukraine, Chairman of the Permanent Delegation of Ukraine at the NATO Parliamentary Assembly.

References

1985 births
Living people
Alumni of King's College London
Servant of the People (political party) politicians
Ninth convocation members of the Verkhovna Rada